Regina—Lewvan is a federal riding in Saskatchewan, made up of parts of the former Palliser and Regina—Lumsden—Lake Centre ridings within the city limits of Regina.

Regina—Lewvan was created in the 2012 federal electoral boundaries redistribution and legally defined in the 2013 representation order. It was first contested in the 42nd Canadian federal election, held on 19 October 2015.

Demographics
According to the Canada 2016 Census
Ethnic groups: 75.1% White, 7.6% Indigenous, 5.8% South Asian, 4.1% Filipino, 2.3% Black, 1.8% Chinese
Languages: 83.5% English, 2.4% Tagalog, 1.5% French, 1.2% Urdu, 1.2% Punjabi
Religions (2011): 69.3% Christian (30.9% Catholic, 12.1% United Church, 7.9% Lutheran, 3.7% Anglican, 2.1% Baptist, 1.9% Christian Orthodox, 1.0% Pentecostal 9.7% Other), 1.6% Muslim, 26.6% None.
Median income: $46,549 (2015) 
Average income: $55,871 (2015)

Members of Parliament

This riding has elected the following Members of Parliament:

Election results

References

Saskatchewan federal electoral districts
Politics of Regina, Saskatchewan